Neil Young (August 28, 1936 – March 7, 2015) was a Canadian politician. He was a New Democratic member of the Canadian parliament from 1980 to 1993. He represented the downtown Toronto ridings of Beaches and Beaches-Woodbine.

Background
Young was born in Edinburgh, Scotland, in 1936. He emigrated to Canada in the 1950s and worked as a machinist in the electrical industry.  He later became an organizer for the United Electrical Workers Union. After leaving politics he worked as a consultant on people with disabilities. He and his wife Vivien raised four children. He died on March 7, 2015, in Toronto.

Politics
He ran unsuccessfully for Toronto City Council's Ward 9 in 1976. He came in 6th place behind winners Pat Sheppard and Tom Wardle Jr.  In a closely contested nomination race, he won the NDP nomination for the Beaches federal electoral district by two votes in 1977. In the federal election of 1979 he lost narrowly to Progressive Conservative candidate Robin Richardson by 518 votes. The PC's won and Richardson served in the short lived Joe Clark minority government. In 1980, Young faced Richardson again, this time defeating him by 1,496 votes. He represented the electoral districts of Beaches from 1980 to 1988, and Beaches—Woodbine from 1988 to 1993, in the House of Commons of Canada as a member of the New Democratic Party (NDP). Young served as the NDP critic on several portfolios such as pensions and veteran's affairs. He was the party's whip from 1981 to 1984.

He was defeated in the 1993 election by Liberal Party of Canada candidate Maria Minna.

Electoral record

References

External links
 

1936 births
2015 deaths
Members of the House of Commons of Canada from Ontario
New Democratic Party MPs
Politicians from Toronto
Scottish emigrants to Canada